Hans Peter Anvin (12 January 1972), also known as hpa, is a Swedish-American computer programmer who has contributed to free and open-source software projects. Anvin is the originator of SYSLINUX, Linux Assigned Names and Numbers Authority (LANANA), and various Linux kernel features.

History

Peter Anvin grew up in Västerås, Sweden. He moved to the United States in 1988, as a teenager, when his father moved to Chicago. 

Anvin was previously maintainer of the linux.* Usenet newsgroup hierarchy and the Linux kernel archives at kernel.org, wrote the original Swap Space How-to, and the "Linux/I386 Boot Protocol" (file: linux/Documentation/i386/boot.txt)

Peter Anvin graduated in 1994 from Northwestern University, where he also was president of the Northwestern Amateur Radio Society (W9BGX); his amateur radio call sign is AD6QZ (formerly N9ITP). According to his personal web site, he is a believer in the Baháʼí Faith.

In addition to his regular employment at Intel's Open Source Technology Center, Anvin was a long-time co-maintainer of the unified x86/x86-64 Linux kernel tree, chief maintainer of the Netwide Assembler (NASM) and SYSLINUX projects.
Previous employers include Transmeta, where he performed as architect and technical director; Orion Multisystems, working on CPU architecture and code morphing software; and rPath.

Linux kernel works

UNIX98 ptys
CPUID driver
The Linux kernel automounter
zisofs
RAID 6 support
x32 ABI
klibc – a minimalistic subset of the standard C library

References 

General
Linux kernel traffic quotes: H. Peter Anvin

Swedish computer programmers
Free software programmers
Linux kernel programmers
People from Västerås
People from San Jose, California
1972 births
Living people
20th-century Bahá'ís
21st-century Bahá'ís
Intel people
Amateur radio people